Frost Meadowcroft is a professional services company specialising in commercial property consultancy. Its offices are at 22 St Peter's Square former offices of Island Records and at 96 Kensington High Street. It specialises in offices and commercial property investments in the area west of west end including Paddington, Kensington, Chelsea, Hammersmith, Fulham and Chiswick.

Selected Projects

22 St Peter's Square, Thames Wharf Studios. 
Chelsea Harbour, Colet Court, Westfield London
Chiswick Tower,
Fulham Green owned by Jon Hunt's Ocubis

Selected Clients

Lifschutz Davidson Sandilands, Next Fifteen Communications, Diageo, Westfield  
Jellycat 
Helical Bar and Rambert Dance Company

In The Press

Frost Meadowcroft's Justin Clack, writes about architecture in Richard Branson's Project magazine and Umbrella Magazine.
 He also writes an architectural and social history article on Westway (London) and Ford Dagenham in Umbrella Magazine's issue 4 and issue 6

References

External links 
 Frost Meadowcroft's website
 Lifschutz Davidson Sandilands' website
 http://www.propertyweek.com/ Property Week's website

Property companies based in London
Commercial real estate companies
Privately held companies of the United Kingdom
Real estate companies established in 1976
1976 establishments in England